Daniel Fisher represented Dedham, Massachusetts in the Great and General Court. He served from 1700 to 1704 and then again in 1712 and 1713. He also served nine terms as selectman beginning in 1690.

In the years leading to the American Revolution Dedham had a number of men rise to protect the liberties of the colonists.  When Governor Edmund Andros was deposed and arrested in 1689 it was Dedham's Daniel Fisher who "burst into [John] Usher's house, to drag forth the tyrant by the collar, to bind him and cast him into a fort" and eventually send him back to England to stand trial. Before being sent to England, he was brought to the home of dominion official John Usher and held under close watch.

He died in 1713 and is interred in a tomb at the Old Village Cemetery.

His father, Daniel Fisher, was Speaker of the House of Representatives. He was said to be He was said to be "heir to his energetic ardor in the cause of freedom." His daughter, Esther, married Timothy Dwight.

References

Works cited

Members of the colonial Massachusetts General Court from Dedham
Year of birth missing
1713 deaths
Burials at Old Village Cemetery
Dedham, Massachusetts selectmen